Lukas Werro (born 30 June 1991) is a Swiss slalom canoeist who has competed since 2007.

He won a bronze medal in the K1 team event at the 2020 European Championships in Prague. Together with his elder brother Simon he placed ninth in the C2 event at the 2016 Summer Olympics in Rio de Janeiro.

References

External links 

 Lukas WERRO at CanoeSlalom.net
 

1991 births
Living people
Canoeists at the 2016 Summer Olympics
Olympic canoeists of Switzerland
Swiss male canoeists